The following television stations broadcast on digital channel 18 in the United States:

 K18AD-D in East Wenatchee, etc., Washington
 K18BN-D in Glasgow, Montana
 K18CB-D in Bullhead City, Arizona
 K18CR-D in Circle, etc., Montana
 K18DD-D in Camp Verde, Arizona, on virtual channel 18
 K18DG-D in Alexandria, Minnesota, on virtual channel 5, which rebroadcasts KSTP-TV
 K18DL-D in Logan, Utah, on virtual channel 14, which rebroadcasts KJZZ-TV
 K18DP-D in Lovelock, Nevada
 K18DR-D in Cortez, etc., Colorado
 K18DT-D in Coeur D'Alene, Idaho
 K18EL-D in Newberg/Tigard, Oregon, on virtual channel 49, which rebroadcasts KPTV and KPDX
 K18ET-D in Orderville, Utah
 K18FN-D in Peetz, Colorado, on virtual channel 31, which rebroadcasts KDVR
 K18FO-D in Idalia, Colorado, on virtual channel 47, which rebroadcasts K21NZ-D
 K18FR-D in Newport, Oregon, on virtual channel 7, which rebroadcasts KOAC-TV
 K18FU-D in Rural Beaver County, Utah
 K18GD-D in Redstone, Colorado
 K18GF-D in Little Falls, Minnesota, on virtual channel 18
 K18GG-D in Mina/Luning, Nevada
 K18GM-D in Pleasant Valley, Colorado, on virtual channel 9, which rebroadcasts KUSA
 K18GT-D in Ryndon, Nevada
 K18GU-D in Ottumwa, Iowa
 K18GX-D in Juab, Utah
 K18HD-D in Bakersfield, California
 K18HF-D in Gallup, New Mexico
 K18HH-D in The Dalles, Oregon, on virtual channel 2, which rebroadcasts KATU
 K18HQ-D in Sandpoint, Idaho
 K18HR-D in Conchas Dam, New Mexico
 K18HX-D in Hollis, Oklahoma
 K18HZ-D in Navajo Mountain, Utah
 K18IA-D in Oljeto, Utah
 K18IB-D in Mexican Hat, Utah
 K18IM-D in Daggett, California, on virtual channel 11, which rebroadcasts KTTV
 K18IP-D in Overton, Nevada
 K18IQ-D in Jacks Cabin, Colorado, on virtual channel 7, which rebroadcasts K11AT-D
 K18IR-D in Olivia, Minnesota, on virtual channel 4, which rebroadcasts WCCO-TV
 K18IT-D in Green River, Utah
 K18IU-D in Mayfield, Utah
 K18IV-D in Mount Pleasant, Utah, on virtual channel 16, which rebroadcasts KUPX-TV
 K18IZ-D in Grandfield, Oklahoma
 K18JA-D in Pinedale, Wyoming
 K18JD-D in Torrington, Wyoming
 K18JE-D in Broadus, Montana
 K18JG-D in Beowowe, Nevada
 K18JJ-D in Crowheart, Wyoming
 K18JM-D in Northome, Minnesota, on virtual channel 11, which rebroadcasts KRII
 K18JU-D in Utahn, Utah
 K18JX-D in Hoehne, Colorado
 K18KA-D in Ely, Nevada
 K18KC-D in Wendover, Utah
 K18KD-D in Libby, Montana
 K18KG-D in Spencer, Iowa
 K18KH-D in Julesburg, Colorado, on virtual channel 9, which rebroadcasts KUSA
 K18KI-D in Baker City, Oregon
 K18KK-D in Columbia, Missouri
 K18KM-D in Conrad, Montana
 K18KO-D in Rural Summit County, Utah
 K18KT-D in Chinook, Montana
 K18LG-D in Shiprock, New Mexico
 K18LH-D in Lewiston, Idaho
 K18LJ-D in Dunsmuir, etc., California
 K18LL-D in Eads, etc., Colorado
 K18LM-D in Mud Canyon, New Mexico
 K18LS-D in Strong City, Oklahoma
 K18LT-D in Eagle Nest, New Mexico
 K18LU-D in Glendale, etc., Oregon
 K18LY-D in Seiling, Oklahoma
 K18LZ-D in Kingman, Arizona
 K18MB-D in International Falls, Minnesota
 K18MC-D in Enterprise, Utah
 K18MD-D in Childress, Texas
 K18ME-D in Richfield, etc., Utah, on virtual channel 11, which rebroadcasts KBYU-TV
 K18MF-D in Torrey, etc., Utah
 K18MG-D in Panguitch, Utah
 K18MH-D in Rural Garfield, Utah
 K18ML-D in Henrieville, Utah
 K18MM-D in Rural Sevier County, Utah
 K18MN-D in Koosharem, Utah
 K18MO-D in Worthington, Minnesota
 K18MP-D in Ridgecrest, California, on virtual channel 28, which rebroadcasts KCET
 K18MS-D in Akron, Colorado, on virtual channel 47, which rebroadcasts K21NZ-D
 K18MT-D in Cedar City, Utah, on virtual channel 9, which rebroadcasts KUEN
 K18MV-D in Scipio/Holden, Utah
 K18MW-D in Leamington, Utah
 K18MX-D in Orangeville, etc., Utah, on virtual channel 7, which rebroadcasts KUED
 K18MY-D in East Carbon County, Utah
 K18MZ-D in Forsyth, Montana
 K18NA-D in Pahrump, Nevada
 K18NB-D in Wray, Colorado, on virtual channel 59, which rebroadcasts K14NM-D
 K18NC-D in Malad, Idaho
 K18ND-D in Chico and Paradise, California
 K18NE-D in St. James, Minnesota
 K18NG-D in McDermitt, Nevada
 K18NH-D in Puyallup, Washington, on virtual channel 7, which rebroadcasts KIRO-TV
 K18NI-D in Point Pulley, etc., Washington, on virtual channel 7, which rebroadcasts KIRO-TV
 K18NJ-D in Bellingham, Washington, on virtual channel 28, which rebroadcasts KBTC-TV
 K18NN-D in Globe, Arizona
 K18NO-D in Lubbock, Texas
 K18NQ-D in Rhinelander, Wisconsin
 K18NT-D in Grand Forks, North Dakota
 K18NW-D in Minot, North Dakota
 K27KD-D in Hatch, Utah
 K32HN-D in Circleville, etc., Utah
 K34JN-D in Montezuma Creek-Anet, Utah
 K34JO-D in Bluff & area, Utah
 K35JL-D in Nephi, Utah, on virtual channel 11, which rebroadcasts KBYU-TV
 K42HK-D in Cottage Grove, Oregon
 KAJJ-CD in Kalispell, Montana
 KALO in Honolulu, Hawaii
 KATN in Fairbanks, Alaska
 KCDT in Coeur D'Alene, Idaho
 KCEI-LD in Taos, New Mexico
 KCPT in Kansas City, Missouri, on virtual channel 19
 KCWH-LD in Lincoln, Nebraska
 KDBC-TV in El Paso, Texas
 KDKZ-LD in Farmington, Missouri
 KDOV-LD in Medford, Oregon
 KEPR-TV in Pasco, Washington
 KFAZ-CA in Visalia, California
 KFSM-TV in Fort Smith, Arkansas
 KFTU-CD in Tucson, Arizona
 KGBT-TV in Harlingen, Texas
 KHME (DRT) in Rapid City, South Dakota
 KHMP-LD in Las Vegas, Nevada
 KIRO-TV (DRT) in Issaquah, Washington, on virtual channel 7
 KIRO-TV (DRT) in Olympia, Washington, on virtual channel 7
 KMYA-DT in Camden, Arkansas
 KNIC-DT in Blanco, Texas
 KOCE-TV in Huntington Beach, California, uses KSCI's spectrum, on virtual channel 50
 KOHD in Bend, Oregon
 KOPX-TV in Oklahoma City, Oklahoma
 KPNX in Mesa, Arizona, on virtual channel 12
 KPSP-CD in Cathedral City, California
 KPTF-DT in Farwell, Texas
 KPXC-TV in Denver, Colorado, on virtual channel 59
 KQDS-TV in Duluth, Minnesota
 KQKT-LD in Tyler, Texas
 KRMJ in Grand Junction, Colorado
 KRNS-CD in Reno, Nevada
 KRTN-LD in Albuquerque, New Mexico
 KSCI in Long Beach, California, on virtual channel 18
 KSVI in Billings, Montana
 KSWE-LD in Liberal, Kansas
 KTEW-LD in Ponca City, Oklahoma
 KTVC in Roseburg, Oregon
 KTVV-LD in Hot Springs, Arkansas
 KTXA in Fort Worth, Texas, on virtual channel 21
 KUEW in St. George, Utah, on virtual channel 18, which rebroadcasts KUED
 KUPB in Midland, Texas
 KUSI-TV in San Diego, California, on virtual channel 51
 KUTB-LD in Salt Lake City, Utah, on virtual channel 18
 KUVS-DT in Modesto, California, on virtual channel 19
 KVAW in Eagle Pass, Texas
 KVHP in Lake Charles, Louisiana
 KYIN in Mason City, Iowa
 KVTJ-DT in Jonesboro, Arkansas
 KXCY-LD in Cheyenne, Wyoming
 KZCS-LD in Colorado Springs, Colorado
 W18BB-D in Elizabeth City, North Carolina
 W18DQ-D in Santa Isabel, Puerto Rico, on virtual channel 18
 W18DS-D in Chattanooga, Tennessee
 W18DZ-D in Ceiba, Puerto Rico, on virtual channel 18
 W18EG-D in Onancock, Virginia
 W18EN-D in Sion Farm, St Croix, U.S. Virgin Islands
 W18EP-D in Weaverville, North Carolina
 W18ER-D in Muskegon, Michigan
 W18ES-D in Mansfield, Ohio
 W18ET-D in Birmingham, Alabama
 W18EU-D in Miami, Florida, on virtual channel 8
 W18EV-D in New Bern, North Carolina
 W18EW-D in Jackson, Tennessee
 W18EZ-D in Delphi, Indiana, on virtual channel 11
 W18FB-D in Sutton, West Virginia
 W18FC-D in Florence, South Carolina
 WAWV-TV in Terre Haute, Indiana
 WBDL-LD in Elk Mound, Wisconsin
 WBGR-LD in Bangor/Dedham, Maine
 WBMM in Tuskegee, Alabama
 WBXC-CD in Champaign/Urbana, Illinois
 WCBZ-CD in Columbus, Ohio, on virtual channel 22
 WCCB in Charlotte, North Carolina, on virtual channel 18
 WDTB-LD in Hamburg, New York
 WDTJ-LD in Toledo, Ohio
 WECN in Naranjito, Puerto Rico, on virtual channel 64
 WEKW-TV in Keene, New Hampshire
 WESH (DRT) in Orange City, Florida, on virtual channel 2
 WEYI-TV in Saginaw, Michigan
 WFWA in Fort Wayne, Indiana
 WIEF-LD in Augusta, Georgia
 WJXT in Jacksonville, Florida
 WKYU-TV in Bowling Green, Kentucky
 WLCN-CD in Charleston, South Carolina
 WLFL in Raleigh, North Carolina, on virtual channel 22
 WLHA-LD in Laurel, Mississippi
 WLPX-TV in Charleston, West Virginia
 WLUK-TV in Green Bay, Wisconsin
 WMAU-TV in Bude, Mississippi
 WMBC-TV in Newton, New Jersey, on virtual channel 63
 WMEU-CD in Chicago, Illinois, on virtual channel 48
 WMOR-TV in Lakeland, Florida, an ATSC 3.0 station, on virtual channel 32
 WMPV-TV in Mobile, Alabama
 WMPX-LD in Dennis, Massachusetts, on virtual channel 33
 WMSN-TV in Madison, Wisconsin
 WMYO-CD in Louisville, Kentucky
 WNYT in Troy, New York
 WOIO (DRT) in Akron, Ohio, on virtual channel 19
 WPGA-LD in Macon, Georgia
 WPXK-TV in Jellico, Tennessee
 WQDH-LD in Wilmington, North Carolina
 WQFT-LD in Ocala, Florida, on virtual channel 17
 WQWQ-LD in Paducah, Kentucky
 WSEC in Jacksonville, Illinois
 WSTR-TV in Cincinnati, Ohio, an ATSC 3.0 station, on virtual channel 64
 WTCE-TV in Fort Pierce, Florida
 WTVH in Syracuse, New York
 WTXI-LD in Miami Florida, uses W18EU-D's spectrum, on virtual channel 11
 WUET-LD in Savannah, Georgia
 WUHO-LD in Kalamazoo, Michigan
 WURO-LD in Roscommon, Michigan
 WUVF-LD in Naples, Florida
 WUVG-DT in Athens, Georgia, on virtual channel 34
 WVVH-CD in Southampton, New York, on virtual channel 18
 WWNY-CD in Massena, New York
 WXTM-LD in Erie, Pennsylvania
 WZDS-LD in Evansville, Indiana
 WZDX in Huntsville, Alabama

The following stations, which are no longer licensed, formerly broadcast on digital channel 18 in the United States:
 K18IW-D in Rapid City, South Dakota
 K18LE-D in Newberry Springs, California
 K18MU-D in Round Mountain, Nevada
 KJVG-LD in Joplin, Missouri
 KTWN-LD in Searcy, Arkansas
 WAPG-CD in Greeneville, Tennessee
 WHNW-LD in Gary, Indiana
 WJPW-CD in Weirton, West Virginia

References

18 digital